Crawshaw is a compact suburb, close to Te Rapa railway depot, in western Hamilton in New Zealand, and extended in the 2018 census to cover . Although sometimes referred to as a suburb in its own right, it is often described as being part of Nawton.

The southern part of the suburb was developed about 1913, but the northern in the 1960s and 1970s. Housing New Zealand properties, tenanted by low income families have been reported to make up a majority of homes.

Crawshaw Park was created between 1979 and 1985.

Demographics 

Crawshaw had a population of 3,249 at the 2018 New Zealand census, an increase of 360 people (12.5%) since the 2013 census, and an increase of 357 people (12.3%) since the 2006 census. There were 960 households, comprising 1,593 males and 1,656 females, giving a sex ratio of 0.96 males per female. The median age was 26.9 years (compared with 37.4 years nationally), with 957 people (29.5%) aged under 15 years, 873 (26.9%) aged 15 to 29, 1,227 (37.8%) aged 30 to 64, and 192 (5.9%) aged 65 or older.

Ethnicities were 52.0% European/Pākehā, 50.2% Māori, 11.8% Pacific peoples, 8.3% Asian, and 2.9% other ethnicities. People may identify with more than one ethnicity.

The percentage of people born overseas was 13.9, compared with 27.1% nationally.

Although some people chose not to answer the census's question about religious affiliation, 55.7% had no religion, 28.9% were Christian, 2.3% had Māori religious beliefs, 3.0% were Hindu, 1.1% were Muslim, 0.6% were Buddhist and 2.5% had other religions.

Of those at least 15 years old, 207 (9.0%) people had a bachelor's or higher degree, and 552 (24.1%) people had no formal qualifications. The median income was $23,800, compared with $31,800 nationally. 117 people (5.1%) earned over $70,000 compared to 17.2% nationally. The employment status of those at least 15 was that 1,092 (47.6%) people were employed full-time, 264 (11.5%) were part-time, and 243 (10.6%) were unemployed.

Crawshaw census area had a block of about 25 houses from Nawton East added in 2018. The population increased by about a quarter from 1996 to 2018. They are poorer and younger than the 37.4 years of the national average, with more than double Hamilton's Māori average of 23.7%. The table below uses the older, slightly smaller census area for the older figures.-

Education

References

See also
Suburbs of Hamilton, New Zealand

Suburbs of Hamilton, New Zealand